Yoshi's bow-fingered gecko (Cyrtodactylus yoshii) s a species of lizard in the family Gekkonidae. The species is endemic to Malaysia.

Etymology
The specific name, yoshii, is in honor of Japanese biologist Ryozo Yoshii (died ca. 1999).

Geographic range
C. yoshii is found in the Malaysian state of Sabah on the island of Borneo.

Habitat
The preferred natural habitat of C. yoshii is forest, where it can be found on the trunks of trees and on the walls of man-made structures.

Description

Diet
C. yoshii preys upon large insects.

Reproduction
C. yoshii is oviparous, but further details of its reproductive habits are unknown.

References

Further reading
Das I (2005). "Bornean Geckos of the Genus Cyrtodactylus". Gekko 4 (2): 11–19.
Goldberg SR, Bursey CR (2017). "Cyrtodactylus yoshii (Yoshi's Bow-fingered Gecko) Endoparasites". Herpetological Review 48 (2): 436.
Hikida T (1990). "Bornean gekkonid lizards of the genus Cyrtodactylus (Lacertilia: Gekkonidae) with descriptions of three new species". Japanese Journal of Herpetology 13 (3): 91–107. (Cyrtodactylus yoshii, new species).
Rösler H (2000). "Kommentierte Liste der rezent, subrezent und fossil bekannten Geckotaxa (Reptilia: Gekkonomorpha)". Gekkota 2: 28–153. (Cyrtodactylus yoshii, p. 67). (in German).

Cyrtodactylus
Reptiles described in 1990